The Vickers Vernon was a British biplane troop carrier used by the Royal Air Force. It entered service in 1921 and was the first dedicated troop transport of the RAF.

The Vernon was a development of the Vickers Vimy Commercial, a passenger variant of the famous Vickers Vimy bomber, and was powered by twin Napier Lion engines or Rolls-Royce Eagle VIII engines. 55 were built.

In February 1923, Vernons of Nos. 45 and 70 Squadrons RAF airlifted nearly 500 troops to Kirkuk, Iraq after the civilian area of that town had been overrun by Kurdish forces. This was the first-ever strategic airlift of troops.

Vernons of No. 45 Squadron had bomb racks and sights fitted. In May 1924 the squadron was officially designated No. 45 (Bombing) Sqdn.

Vernons were replaced by Vickers Victorias from 1927.

Variants
Vernon Mk I
 military transport aircraft powered by two  V-12 Rolls-Royce Eagle VIII piston engines.
Vernon Mk II
 military transport aircraft powered by two  W-12 Napier Lion II piston engines.
Vernon Mk III
 military transport aircraft powered by two high compression  W-12 Napier Lion III piston engines.

Operators

 Royal Air Force
 No. 45 Squadron RAF
 No. 70 Squadron RAF

Specifications (Vernon)

See also

References

 
 
 
 
 
 
 

1920s British military transport aircraft
Vernon
Biplanes